Kala Keerthi Sumitra Peries (24 March 1935 – 19 January 2023) was a Sri Lankan filmmaker. She was the first female film director from Sri Lanka, and was known as the "Poetess of Sinhala Cinema". She also held the post of Sri Lanka's ambassador to France, Spain and the United Nations in the late 1990s. Of her films the more popular ones are Gehenu Lamai, Ganga Addara and Yahaluvo. She was married to the most prolific Sri Lankan film director Dr. Lester James Peries.

Early life
Born Sumitra Gunawardena, on 24 March 1935 to a Marxist family known as the "Boralugoda Gunewardene's" in Avissawella. Her father, Henry (better known as Harry) Gunawardena was a proctor in Avissawella, and brother of the famous politicians Philip Gunawardena and Robert Gunawardena and her mother, Harriette Wickramasinghe was from a middle-class family. Three of Sumitra's relatives, Dinesh Gunawardena, Gitanjana Gunawardena and Prasanna Gunawardena, are current politicians in Sri Lankan. When Sumitra was just 14 years of age, her mother died. At that time her brother Gamini was five years older and her sister Chandralatha, three years older. She also has a younger brother Ranjith. After the tragedy of their mother's death, Gamini went to the south of France and lived in a yacht with a French painter.

Education
Peries began her education in Avissawella, then later enrolled to Visakha Vidyalaya in Colombo and finally joined the Aquinas College Colombo to do the London Advanced Level. At the age of 20 Sumitra managed to find some money and travelled to Europe by ship to meet her elder brother Gamini. She was to build her own career there, although she didn't know it at the time.

Peries studied filmmaking at the London School of Film Technique and was awarded a Diploma in Film Direction and Production (1957–1959). She was the only woman studying this subject there at that time. After passing out, she began working at Mai Harris, a subtitling firm for a short period and later returned home to Sri Lanka. It was briefly before she left that she happened to meet her to-be-husband at the residence of Vernon Mendis, who was a mutual friend of Lester and Sumitra.

Later on her arrival in Sri Lanka, her brother Gamini contacted Lester and checked the possibility of her sister working with him on a shoot. Lester agreed and Sumitra started work as assistant director in his second film Sandesaya. A filmmaking company called Cinelanka was established later in 1963 with Anton Wickramasinghe, Lester and Sumitra as major shareholders.

Career

Film career
Peries started off her own cinema director debut with her first film Gehenu Lamai featuring newly discovered talent in the young Vasanthi Chathurani. The film was a box office hit and managed to bag many awards at the film festivals of the time. Her next film Ganga Addara also featuring Vasanthi Chathurani, Vijaya Kumaratunge and Sanath Gunathileke was another box-office hit. She has subsequently directed many more feature films which have all been subjected to international acclaim.

Professional career
In the 1980s, Sumitra was a member of the presidential commission for two years to conduct an inquiry into Sri Lanka's film sector regarding all aspects of the industry such as its troubles, statistics, public opinions and recommendations. 

Peries was in charge of production for Worldview International in Sri Lanka in 1988–1990. Also during the late 1980s and early 1990s, she was a member of the Board of Management of the Institute of Aesthetique Studies, Kelaniya University, Sri Lanka during which Prof A. J. Gunewardena was the director general of the institute. 

Peries later served as Sri Lanka's ambassador to France and Spain in 1996–1999 and was also appointed the ambassador of Sri Lanka to the United Nations by President Chandrika Bandaranayake Kumaratunge. She served at her post during the bicentennial of "FILM" in its birthplace - France – and was conveniently able to take part in all celebrations along with her spouse Lester James Peries.

Peries won the award for the best film director in fifty years of Sri Lankan cinema.

Later career
Sumitra Peries last film venture Vaishnavee, shot in 2012, made her the first director ever to shoot with the latest Red Epic camera and this step has laid the foundation for the next Generation of Digital Cinema for Sri Lanka. The film is speculated to be released around March next year. 
Lester and Sumithra Peries celebrated their Golden wedding anniversary on 19 June 2014 and lived happily in the comfort of their home located down the road named after Dr Lester James Peries.

There are two books written about her, namely, Sumitra Peries- by Vilasnee Tampoe-Hautin (English) and Sumitra - by Ajith Galappaththi (Sinhala).

Personal life and death
Sumitra married Lester James Peries (1919–2018) on 19 June 1964 at All Saints Church, Borella and a reception was held at the residence of Anton Wickremasinghe afterwards.

Peries died on 19 January 2023, at the age of 87.

The Lester James Peries and Sumitra Peries Foundation
The Lester James Peries and Sumitra Peries foundation was inaugurated on Thursday 9 June 2011 at the BMICH with an oration by the chief Guest - celebrated Indian film-maker Padma Vibushan Dr Adoor Gopalakrishnan and the Speaker of Parliament Chamal Rajapakse was the Guest of Honour. The Foundation is incorporated through an act of Parliament of the Democratic Socialist Republic of Sri Lanka. The bill of incorporation was forwarded to parliament by Hon. Malini Fonseka on 5 January 2011.

Honours 
The title of Kala Keerthi by the Government of Sri Lanka in 2005.
The Order of the Rising Sun, Gold and Silver Rays by the Government of Japan in 2021.
Awarded an Honorary Doctorate from the University of Kelaniya for her outstanding contribution to the local cinema.

Awards

International awards
Carthage International Film Festival – Gehenu Lamai – Diploma of Merit (1978), shared the jury award with Mirinal Sen of India.
London Film Festival – Gehenu Lamai – Outstanding Film of the Year (1978)
South Asian Film Festival in Tokyo, Japan – Ganga Addara – Diploma
Moscow International Film Festival – Yahalu Yeheli – Diploma (1984), purchased by a German television channel in 1986
Filmex International Film Festival, Los Angeles – Yahalu Yeheli – Diploma (1985)
International Film Festival, Tokyo – Sagara Jalaya – One of the Ten Best Films, purchased by a Japanese television station
Nantes International Film Festival – Loku Duwa – Diploma (1993)
Fukuoka International Film Festival – Loku Duwa (1994)
London Film Festival – Duwata Mawaka Misa – Diploma (1998)
International Film Festival, India – Duwata Mawaka Misa (1998)
Fukuoka International Film Festival – Duwata Mawaka Misa (1998)
Golden Lotus – Deauville Award for "Contribution to Asian Cinema" (2001)

National awards

Best Editor:

Gamperaliya – Sarasaviya Film Awards (1964)
Delovak Athara – Sarasaviya Film Awards (1967)
Ahasin Polawata – Presidential Awards (1979) & OCIC Awards (1979)
Bakmaha Deege – Critics Awards (1971)

Best Director:

Ganga Addara – Sarasaviya Film Awards (1981) & Presidential Awards (1981)
Yahalu Yeheli – Presidential Awards (1983) & OCIC Awards (1983)
Maya – Sarasaviya Film Awards (1984) & National Award for Best Film and Best Director (1986)
Sagara Jalaya – OCIC Awards (1989) & Swarna Sanka Awards (1988)
Loku Duwa – Presidential Awards (1989) & Sarasaviya Silver Jubilee Awards (1988)
Duwata Mawaka Misa Presidential Awards (1996)
Zonta Arthur C Clark Award for Communication (1988)
Rana Thisara Lifetime Achievement Award (1993)

See also 
 Sri Lankan Non Career Diplomats

References

External links
Female genius behind the camera
Official Website of Lester James Peries in association with Ministry of Cultural Affairs, Sri Lanka

1935 births
2023 deaths
Sri Lankan film directors
Sri Lankan women film directors
Ambassadors of Sri Lanka to France
Alumni of Visakha Vidyalaya
Sinhalese people
Sri Lankan women ambassadors
Kala Keerthi
Recipients of the Order of the Rising Sun, 5th class
People from Colombo District